John Malcolm Breck (April 9, 1828 – February 21, 1900) was a businessman in Portland, Oregon, United States, who served as mayor of Portland from 1861 to 1862.

Breck was born in Berks County, Pennsylvania, in 1828.  At sixteen he left Pennsylvania for Wisconsin. In 1850, he left Wisconsin for Oregon on the vessel Columbia.  He served as purser for the voyage.  In 1857 and 1858 Breck was elected Assessor of Portland.

He was elected mayor of Portland on April 1, 1861.  He was succeeded as mayor by William H. Farrar in 1862.  He served as a Portland city councilman in 1868–70 and as City Assessor again in 1872–73.

Breck died at his home in Portland on February 21, 1900.

References

1828 births
1900 deaths
Mayors of Portland, Oregon
Portland City Council members (Oregon)
Oregon Republicans
19th-century American politicians